The 1993 Indian Federation Cup (known as Bharat Petroleum Federation Cup for sponsorship reasons) was the 17th season of the Federation Cup, a football competition. The competition was won by Mohun Bagan, who defeated Mahindra & Mahindra 1–0 in the final.

Group stage

Group A

Matches
 Mohun Bagan 0–0 East Bengal
 Mohun Bagan 1–1 Southern Railway
 Mohun Bagan 1–0 Indian Telephone Industries Limited
 East Bengal 1–0 Southern Railway
 East Bengal 0–0 Indian Telephone Industries Limited
 Southern Railway 1–0 Indian Telephone Industries Limited

Group B

Matches
 Mahindra & Mahindra 0–0 Kerala Police
 Mahindra & Mahindra 3–0 Churchill Brothers
 Mahindra & Mahindra 0–0 Titanium
 Kerala Police 0–0 Churchill Brothers
 Kerala Police 2–0 Titanium
 Churchill Brothers 3–0 Titanium

Semi-finals

Final

References

External links
 1993 Federation Cup

Indian Federation Cup seasons
1993–94 domestic association football cups
1993–94 in Indian football